NorthShore University HealthSystem (formerly Evanston Northwestern Healthcare or ENH) is an integrated healthcare delivery system serving patients throughout the Chicago metropolitan area.

NorthShore encompasses six hospitals, as of late 2021 — Evanston, Glenbrook, Highland Park, Skokie, Swedish, and Northwest Community — as well as NorthShore Medical Group with more than 70 offices and more than 800 primary and specialty care physicians, the Research Institute and Foundation. In total, the health system employs more than 10,000 people.

NorthShore has a teaching affiliation with the University of Chicago Pritzker School of Medicine.

History 

NorthShore was founded as Evanston Hospital in 1891 during an outbreak of typhoid fever. In the early 1900s Evanston Hospital expanded and became a teaching hospital.

Louis W. Sauer developed a vaccine for whooping cough (pertussis) at Evanston Hospital in the 1920s. The hospital became affiliated with Northwestern University and the Feinberg School of Medicine in the 1930s.

Evanston Hospital expanded to 475 beds during the 1940s and established intensive care, cardiac care, kidney dialysis center and neonatology units.

Evanston Hospital opened Glenbrook Hospital in 1977. In 1981, the Kellogg Cancer Care Center was established, the first cancer center built by a community hospital in the nation. Highland Park Hospital was acquired in 2000. The Kellogg Cancer Care Center was demolished in 2008 and a new building was scheduled to open in 2010.

ENH to NorthShore University HealthSystem 

Formerly known as Evanston Northwestern Healthcare (ENH) while affiliated with Northwestern University Medical School, the integrated healthcare delivery system changed its academic affiliation and name in September 2008.

In a letter in NorthShore's 2008 annual report, President and CEO Mark Neaman said the organization opted for a new name because "we have simply outgrown our old name."  Neaman stated that the name change - specifically dropping "Evanston" and adding "University" - reflected the changes NorthShore had undergone in recent years.  
NorthShore's four Hospitals stretch "far beyond our 'hometown' of Evanston," Neaman said. The addition of "University" was meant to reflect the integrated healthcare system's status as a teaching hospital and "recognized our new teaching affiliation with the University of Chicago Pritzker School of Medicine."  The change from "Healthcare" to "HealthSystem" was brought about by a "position in Northern Illinois as a comprehensive integrated delivery system of care."

The driving force behind the name change from "Evanston Northwestern Healthcare" to "NorthShore University Health System" was the result of a termination of the academic affiliation with Northwestern University Feinberg School of Medicine, thereby making the word "Northwestern" in the ENH name no longer appropriate. ENH subsequently established an academic affiliation with the University of Chicago Pritzker School of Medicine, thus the word "University" in its new title.

Mergers and acquisitions 

Highland Park Hospital joined NorthShore in 2000. Skokie Hospital, formerly Rush North Shore Medical Center, was transferred to NorthShore in January 2009.

NorthShore University HealthSystem absorbed Swedish (Covenant) Hospital in 2020 and Northwest Community Hospital in 2021.

In late 2021, a planned merger with Edward-Elmhurst Health was announced, pending regulatory approval, for a potential system total of nine hospitals.

On 5 January 2022, NorthShore University HealthSystem and Edward-Elmhurst Health announced the completion of their merger.

Locations

Evanston Hospital 

Evanston Hospital is located north of downtown Evanston at 2650 Ridge Ave. at the intersection with Central Street.  It serves as the flagship facility for NorthShore

The hospital has a Level I trauma center, Women's Hospital and Cardiovascular Care Center. The Kellogg Cancer Center recently opened in its brand new facility on the campus.

Glenbrook Hospital 

Glenbrook Hospital sits at 2100 Pfingsten Road in Glenview, Illinois. The facility was built in 1977. Glenbrook offers cardiac catheterization and ultra fast CT scan, total hip and knee replacement, the Eye and Vision Center for LASIK and other eye surgery, and neurological services including a new sleep center, a cognitive and memory disorder program and a Parkinson's Disease clinic. The hospital serves the communities of Glenview and Northbrook, as well as the surrounding communities. The hospital serves as a point of dispensing (POD) facility for disaster response.

The hospital has a Level II trauma center and Fast Track service for patients with minor illnesses and injuries.

Highland Park Hospital 

Highland Park Hospital (HPH) is located a 777 Park Avenue West in Highland Park, Illinois The hospital joined ENH in 2000.

HPH's Kellogg Cancer Center has facilities to offer care to oncology patients in Lake County. The hospital offers care for the following types of cancer: thoracic and lung; hematology; breast; ovarian; head and neck; melanoma and sarcoma; gastrointestinal; prostate; and stomach. Highland Park Hospital also offers a stroke center.  Highland Park features a new Ambulatory Care Center and Wound Care Center. The hospital serves as a point of dispensing (POD) facility for disaster response.

Skokie Hospital 

Skokie Hospital, formerly Rush North Shore Medical Center, joined NorthShore University HealthSystem in January 2009. The hospital serves Skokie and the surrounding communities and is located at 9600 Gross Point Road.

Swedish Hospital 

Swedish Hospital, formerly Swedish Covenant Hospital, joined NorthShore University HealthSystem in January 2020. The hospital serves the north side of Chicago.

Northwest Community Hospital 

Northwest Community Hospital, as of January 2021 joined the Northshore University HealthSystem as part of buyout of Northwest Community Healthcare.  The Northwest Community Healthcare Group was to be merged into the NorthShore University HealthSystem within the years ahead.

Research 
Established in 1996, the NorthShore Research Institute serves more than 1,000 research projects and more than 150 externally funded research faculty. Priority areas for research are medical genetics, cancer, neurosciences, advanced imaging research, cardiovascular, peri-neonatal and outcomes research. The Research Institute has approximately 125,000 net square feet of research space.

Included is a collaborative building with Northwestern University on its Evanston Campus called the Arthur and Gladys Pancoe-NorthShore University HealthSystem Life Sciences Pavilion, and the Charles R. Walgreen Jr. Building on the Evanston Hospital campus. Emphasis is on translational and clinical research allowing discoveries from the basic sciences and engineering to be brought promptly to the bedside. Funding from the National Institutes of Health (NIH) places the hospitals of NorthShore University HealthSystem at No. 9 among multi-specialty independent research hospitals in the country.

Fundraising

NorthShore Foundation 
The NorthShore University HealthSystem (NorthShore) Foundation is the leading philanthropic entity of NorthShore, working to advance relationships that may result in charitable contributions in support of NorthShore's mission.

The Auxiliary 
The Auxiliary of NorthShore University HealthSystem is a fund-raising organization of volunteers also providing service and community awareness for NorthShore hospitals and programs. The Auxiliary's members are the driving force behind many fund-raising and friend-raising projects, including their major annual event - the American Craft Exposition (ACE) - as well as a variety of service projects such as flower delivery to patients, local school visits, an annual nursing scholarship and much more. Since its inception in 1937, The Auxiliary has raised more than $20 million. Auxiliary operations come under the administrative oversight of NorthShore Foundation.

The Associate Board 
Also within the Foundation is The Associate Board of NorthShore University HealthSystem, a fund-raising organization of young professionals.

COVID-19 Vaccination Lawsuit
In 2021, Northshore University HealthSystem was sued by employees who were denied a religious exemption from taking the COVID-19 injection and fired from their jobs.  As part of the settlement awarded in the federal Northern District Court of Illinois, Northshore was ordered to rehire the workers and pay them a total of $10.3 million in damages. The dozen plus dismissed employees from Northshore were joined by other fired healthcare workers for a class-action suit on behalf of 500 individuals, each of whom was awarded $25,000 plus additional monetary damages if they later complied and took the vaccine.  While this was not the first legal decision protecting workers from being permanently fired for refusing the shot, it did set precedent as the first case in the U.S. in which petitioners were awarded monetary damages for abrogation of their Title VII rights.

References

Healthcare in Illinois
Evanston, Illinois
Skokie, Illinois
Highland Park, Illinois
Hospital networks in the United States
Medical and health organizations based in Illinois
1891 establishments in Illinois